Lu Verne Township is a township in Kossuth County, Iowa, United States.

History
Lu Verne Township (formerly Luverne) was organized in 1882.

References

Townships in Kossuth County, Iowa
Townships in Iowa
1882 establishments in Iowa
Populated places established in 1882